Environment most often refers to:

 Natural environment, all living and non-living things occurring naturally
 Biophysical environment, the physical and biological factors along with their chemical interactions that affect an organism or a group of organisms

Other physical and cultural environments 

Ecology, the branch of ethology that deals with the relations of organisms to one another and to their physical surroundings
Environment (systems), the surroundings of a physical system that may interact with the system by exchanging mass, energy, or other properties
Built environment, constructed surroundings that provide the setting for human activity, ranging from the large-scale civic surroundings to the personal places
Social environment, the culture that an individual lives in, and the people and institutions with whom they interact
Market environment, business term

Arts, entertainment and publishing
 Environment (magazine), a peer-reviewed, popular environmental science publication founded in 1958
 Environment (1917 film), 1917 American silent film
 Environment (1922 film), 1922 American silent film
 Environment (1927 film), 1927 Australian silent film
 Environments (album series), a series of LPs, cassettes and CDs depicting natural sounds
 Environments (album), a 2007 album by The Future Sound of London
"Environment", a song by Dave from Psychodrama
 Environments (journal), a scientific journal

In computing 
 Environment (type theory), the association between variable names and data types in type theory
 Deployment environment, in software deployment, a computer system in which a computer program or software component is deployed and executed
 Runtime environment, a virtual machine state which provides software services for processes or programs while a computer is running

See also 
 Environmentalism, a broad philosophy, ideology, and social movement regarding concerns for environmental protection
 Environmental science
 Environment variable